The Asia/Oceania Zone was one of three zones of regional competition in the 2008 Fed Cup.

Group I
Venue: National Tennis Development Centre, Bangkok, Thailand (outdoor hard)
Date: 30 January – 2 February

The eight teams were divided into two pools of four teams. The teams that finished first in the pools played-off to determine which team would partake in the World Group II Play-offs. The two nations coming last in the pools also played-off to determine which would be relegated to Group II for 2009.

Pools

Play-offs

  advanced to 2008 World Group II Play-offs.
  was relegated to Group II for 2009.

Group II
Venue: National Tennis Development Centre, Bangkok, Thailand (outdoor hard)
Date: 30 January – 2 February

The seven teams were divided into one pool of three teams and one pool of four. The top team of each pool played-off against each other to decide which nation progress to the Group I.

Pools

Play-offs

  advanced to Group I for 2009.

See also
Fed Cup structure

References

 Fed Cup Profile, Thailand
 Fed Cup Profile, Uzbekistan
 Fed Cup Profile, Singapore
 Fed Cup Profile, Hong Kong
 Fed Cup Profile, Australia
 Fed Cup Profile, Sri Lanka
 Fed Cup Profile, South Korea
 Fed Cup Profile, India
 Fed Cup Profile, Kazakhstan
 Fed Cup Profile, Syria
 Fed Cup Profile, New Zealand

External links
 Fed Cup website

 
Asia Oceania
Sport in Bangkok
Tennis tournaments in Thailand